The Cardy Site is located on the Door Peninsula south of Sturgeon Bay, Wisconsin. It was added to the National Register of Historic Places in 2010.

History
The site once served as a home to Paleo-Indians.

As the city of Sturgeon Bay expanded, part of the site was developed and due to the disturbance of the soil is no longer considered useful for archeological research. The remaining, undeveloped portion of the site was protected by the Cardy family beginning in 1960, added to the Wisconsin State Register of Historic Places in 2009, and today belongs to The Archaeological Conservancy. It is open to the public and listed as a point of interest near the Ice Age Trail.

Further reading 
 Pushing Back Time in Wisconsin, Mammoth Trumpet, Volume 19, Number 1, December 2003, pages 15–18 (pages 16–19 of the pdf)
 Life During The End Of The Ice Age: The Cardy site could inform archaeologists about how humans dealt with a challenging environment., American Archaeology Vol. 14, No. 3, Fall 2010, page 46 (page 48 of the pdf)
 Late Paleo-Indian Period Lithic Economies, Mobility, and Group Organization in Wisconsin by Ethan Adam Epstein, Ph.D. Thesis, University of Wisconsin-Milwaukee, December 2016, page 52 (page 66 of the pdf) and pages 156–164 (pages 156–178 of the pdf)
 Lithic Materials and Paleolithic Societies, edited by Brian Adams and Brooke S. Blades, Hoboken, New Jersey: Blackwell, 2009, Chapter 20: "Clovis and Dalton: Unbounded and Bounded Systems in the Midcontinent of North America" by Brad Koldehoff and Thomas J. Loebel, section on "Clovis: unbounded land use", part 10. Cardy, page 277

References

Archaeological sites on the National Register of Historic Places in Wisconsin
Protected areas of Door County, Wisconsin
Native American history of Wisconsin
National Register of Historic Places in Door County, Wisconsin